Roberto González Escarrá (born c. 1890) was an Argentine football player. He played as defender in Club Atlético Porteño and in the Argentina national team.

Career 
Born in Buenos Aires Province, González Escarrá began his career in the youth division of Lomas Athletic Club. He then played in Instituto Americano of Adrogué, team that played the final of the Copa de Competencia Adolfo Bullrich in 1908.

In 1908, González Escarrá moved to Porteño, where he won his first Primera División title with the club in 1912, then winning a new championship in 1914, both organised by dissident Federación Argentina de Football. With Porteño, González Escarrá also won the Copa de Competencia Jockey Club in 1915, after beating Racing Club by 2-1.

In 1914, Roberto González Escarrá was called-up to the Argentina national team. His first game was a friendly match v. Brazil, played on September 20, 1914, in the Gimnasia y Esgrima de Buenos Aires stadium, which was won by Argentina by 3-0.

Titles 
Porteño
 Primera División (2): 1912 FAF, 1914 FAF
 Copa de Competencia Jockey Club (1): 1915

References 

Argentine footballers
Argentina international footballers
Footballers from Buenos Aires
Argentine people of Basque descent
Argentine people of Spanish descent
1890s births
Year of birth uncertain
Year of death missing
People from Adrogué
Association football defenders